Bešlagić is a Bosniak, Croatian noble surname. Notable people with the surname include:

Enis Bešlagić (born 1975), actor and TV personality
Rešad Bešlagić (1912–1945), folk singer
Selim Bešlagić (born 1942), Bosnian politician
Šefik Bešlagić (1908–1999), cultural historian

Bosnian surnames